In many online video games (especially MMORPGs, MOBAs or real-time strategy games), the term nuke can describe a spell or skill that is capable of dealing a large amount of damage to its target, which is frequently a unit. Also in the context of video games, "nuking" may also describe the act of using a nuclear weapon while playing the game, such as the atomic bomb in Call of Duty games.

The term is notably dissimilar in different genres.

In an MMORPG, nuking may differ in meaning between different communities. For example, to some individuals, to "nuke" is to deal the most possible damage to the most enemies possible (almost exclusively by means of an area of effect skill), whereas other individuals use the term by referring to the highest possible damage to a single target in the shortest amount of time, also known as a spike. Some individuals believe that the player, or players, nuking must do so by means of ranged combat (that is, out of melee range); others make no such distinction. It can also mean to critical hit often or just to deal high standard damage.

In a real-time or turn-based strategy game, the term "nuke" has one distinct use. It can describe the tactic of attacking an opponent's specific (often high-priority) units with high-damage spells in order to kill them or force (or strongly encourage) the opposing player to remove them from battle. Such usage is common in Warcraft III, in which "Heroes" are frequently the targets and attackers due to their relative high priority and common faculty for high-damaging spells.

See also
 MMORPGs

References

Esports terminology
Video game terminology